The twelve-wired bird-of-paradise (Seleucidis melanoleucus) is a medium-sized, approximately  long, velvet black and yellow bird-of-paradise. The male has a red iris, long black bill and rich yellow plumes along his flanks.  From the rear of these plumes emerge twelve blackish, wire-like filaments, which bend back near their bases to sweep forward over the bird's hindquarters. The female is a brown bird with black-barred buffy underparts. Their feet are strong, large-clawed and pink in color.

The display dance of the twelve-wired bird of paradise is called a wire-wipe display and it is performed by males to attract females by showing their flank plumes and bare pigmented thighs. Males use their 12 flank plume "wires" to make contact with the female by brushing across the female's face and foreparts. 

The sole representative of the monotypic genus Seleucidis, the twelve-wired bird-of-paradise is a bird of lowland forests. The male displays on an exposed vertical perch with his breast-shield flared. Their diet consists mainly of fruits and arthropods in addition to frogs, insects, and nectar.

They are found in flat lowlands and swamp forests, particularly throughout New Guinea and Salawati Island, Indonesia. The twelve-wired bird-of-paradise is evaluated as Least Concern on the IUCN Red List of Threatened Species, and is listed on Appendix II of CITES. It has not been easy to breed them in captivity. The first successful captive breeding program was at Singapore's Jurong Bird Park, in 2001.

Gallery

References

External links 
 BirdLife Species Factsheet
 Video showing Bird-of-Paradise courting a female  Tim Laman.  Jayapura Western New Guinea. June 2010.

twelve-wired bird-of-paradise
Birds of New Guinea
twelve-wired bird-of-paradise